Vasas SC is a Hungarian women's handball team. It is part of the Budapest-based multi-sports club Vasas SC. One of the most successful teams in the country, they have won the Hungarian championship a record 15 times and in 1982 they were also crowned as the European Champions Cup winners.

Brief history 
Hazena, the early form of the modern handball, had been played across Europe for years, when, in 1926, based on the players who were fired by MTE for political reasons, Vas- és Fémmunkások Sport Clubja was founded. Until 1928 there was not an organized national championship and the hazena team participated only in several invitational tournaments. Due to financial reasons the club suspended its operations in 1931.

After a financial consolidation the handball department of Vasas was reborn and entered the championship in 1938. The brightest year of this era was 1945, when Vasas won the second division title and gained promotion to the top level championship. However, just after a few years, due growing troubles the club decided to withdraw from the competitive handball once again.

On 7 March 1956 the Sport School of Angyalföld (Angyalföldi Sportiskola) was founded. Under head coach József Ferenczy the Sport School performed brilliantly, having won several youth and junior titles. They also wanted to enter the adult competition, but the permit was not granted. Instead of that, they got the chance from Hungarian Handball Federation to join either Csavargyár or Vasas. They have chosen Vasas and the team has risen from its ashes in 1960. With the ASI-girls on the board, under the new, team handball rules, Vasas entered the Budapest II championship and won it in their inaugural year and gained promotion. In 1962 they celebrated another promotion, this time from the Budapest I division to the NB II. In 1964 Vasas climbed to the NB I, the top-level league in Hungary. Although they suffered a surprise relegation in 1965, they spent only one season in the NB II. With the comeback in 1967 the brightest period in the club's life began.

In 1969 the Vasas lifted the Hungarian Cup trophy, followed by another Cup title in 1971. From 1972 they have won the Hungarian Championship an exceptional eleven times in a row – in 1977 and 1981 they did not even drop a single point throughout the season. Adding to this, they also won the Hungarian Cup eight times in this period. Their most successful year came in 1982, when Vasas did the treble: beside the Hungarian Championship and Hungarian Cup they took the European Champions Cup title as well.

From the second part of the eighties the key players of the golden era either retired or moved abroad and the Hungarian Championship got more balanced as well, which led to Vasas slowly lost their dominant role.

In the nineties, after the transition, private companies took over the club and became their main sponsor. In short term Vasas benefited from it, they managed to put together a strong squad and the team was shining in the old glory. However, after these financials grown narrow, a disintegration process started. To save from cessation, in 2004 Vasas Sport Club took the team under control. In 2009, Vasas said goodbye to NB I.

After eight years, the team was able to start the 2017/18 season again in the top division after winning the NB I / B Championship. However, the cutting-edge outing lasted only a year. The team was promoted again in 2021, but was eliminated at the end of the season.

Crest, colours, supporters

Kit manufacturers and Shirt sponsor
The following table shows in detail Vasas SC kit manufacturers and shirt sponsors by year:

Team

Current squad
Squad for the 2022–23 season

Goalkeepers
 27  Annamária Kurucz
 72  Panna Zsigmond
Wingers
RW
 3  Réka Imrei
  Dalma Domokos
LW
 22  Kyra Oláh 
 14  Petra Sárkány
  Eszter Lengyel
Line players
  Barbara Bánhidi
  Katalin Dombi

Back players
LB
 8  Zsuzsanna Nagy
 10  Evelin Speth
 18  Fanni Szilovics
 23  Dóra Blaubacher
CB
 37  Laura Pénzes
  Dóra Györfi
RB

Transfers for the 2022–23 season

 Joining
  Barbara Bánhidi (LP) (from  Kozármisleny)
  Katalin Dombi (LP) (from  Kisvárdai KC)
  Dóra Györfi (PM) (from  Eger)
  Eszter Lengyel (LW) (from  Eger)
  Dalma Domokos (RW) (from  Alba Fehérvár KC)
  Tamara Kobela (LB) (from  Békéscsabai Előre NKSE) (left to MTK Budapest as of December 2022)

 Leaving
  Bianka Ács (LP)
  Luca Faragó (LP) (to  Mosonmagyaróvári KC SE)
  Nóra Gercsó (GK) (to  Kispest)
  Fanni Hadnagy (LP) (to  Eger)
  Blanka Kajdon (CB) (to  Siófok KC)
  Noémi Kovács (RW)
  Melinda Szatmári (LW)
  Marija Agbaba (RB) (to  Békéscsabai Előre NKSE)
  Marija Dmitrovic (RB)

Staff members 
  Chairman: László Markovits
  Technical Director: Ferenc Venczkó
  Head Coach: Gergely Penszki
  Assistant Coach/Youth Coach: György Papp
  Goalkeeper Coach: István Bakos

Honours

Domestic competitions
Nemzeti Bajnokság I (National Championship of Hungary)
 Champions (15) – record: 1972, 1973, 1974, 1975, 1976, 1977, 1978, 1979, 1980, 1981, 1982, 1984, 1985, 1991–92, 1992–93
 Runners-up (1): 1986
 Third place (7): 1953, 1967, 1969, 1971, 1993–94, 1994–95, 1996–97

Magyar Kupa (National Cup of Hungary)
 Winners (11): 1969, 1971, 1974, 1976, 1978, 1979, 1980, 1981, 1982, 1984, 1986
 Finalist (7): 1970, 1977, 1987, 1991–92, 1992–93, 1994–95, 1996–97

European competitions
European Champions Cup:
Winners: 1982
Finalists: 1978, 1979, 1993, 1994
EHF Cup Winners' Cup:
Finalists: 1988
Semifinalists: 1996
EHF Cup:
Semifinalists: 1997
EHF City Cup:
Finalists: 1995

Recent seasons

Seasons in Nemzeti Bajnokság I: 45
Seasons in Nemzeti Bajnokság I/B: 11
Seasons in Nemzeti Bajnokság II: 3

In European competition

Participations in Champions League (Champions Cup): 13x
Participations in EHF Cup (IHF Cup): 2x
Participations in Challenge Cup (City Cup): 2x
Participations in Cup Winners' Cup (IHF Cup Winners' Cup): 4x

Head coach history

Notable players 

  Ágota Bujdosó
  Ágnes Babos Fleckné
  Györgyi Győrvári Őriné
  Éva Barna
  Mariann Nagy Gódorné
  Margit Brinzay
  Éva Angyal
  Amália Sterbinszky
  Katalin Gombai
  Anikó Szabadfi Kuruczné
  Tünde Lantos
  Zsuzsa Balogh Liskáné
  Aladárné Krámer
  Klára Horváth
  Mária Vanya Vadászné
  Mária Hajós Ihászné
  Ilona Samus Mihálykáné
  Anna György
  Orsolya Vérten
  Zsuzsanna Tomori
  Ágnes Triffa
  Melinda Pastrovics
  Judit Simics
  Éva Erdős
  Andrea Farkas
  Irina Sirina
  Rita Borbás
  Anikó Kántor
  Rita Deli
  Zsanett Borbély
  Zsuzsanna Lovász
  Szilvia Ábrahám
  Olívia Kamper
  Ágota Utasi
  Rita Hochrajter
  Györgyi Hang
  Márta Varga
  Zsófia Pásztor
  Krisztina Nagy
  Adrienn Gaál
  Cristina Mihai
  Mihaela Galai
  Žaneta Tóthová
  Alzbeta Polláková
  Natalia Gorova
  Svetlana Moskovaya
  Irina Chernova
  Olesia Semenchenko
  Melinda Jacques

See also 
 Vasas SC

References 

 History of Vasas SC handball department

External links 
Official website

Hungarian handball clubs
Handball clubs established in 1926
1926 establishments in Hungary
Sport in Budapest